Alessandro Quaini (born 17 September 1998) is an Italian professional football player who plays as a midfielder for  club Fiorenzuola.

Club career

Genoa 
Born in Cremona, Quaini was a youth exponent of Genoa.

Loan to Fondi 
On 16 August 2017, Quaini was signed by Serie C club Fondi on a season-long loan deal. On 2 September he made his professional debut in Serie C for Fondi as a substitute replacing Luca Ricciardi in the 64th minute of a 1–0 home defeat against Monopoli. On 7 October, Quaini played his first entire match for the club, a 1–0 away defeat against Matera. He became Fondi's first-choice early in the season. On 4 November he received his first red card in his career in the 65th minute of a 1–1 away draw against Cosenza. Quaini ended his loan to Fondi with 28 appearances, including 19 as a starter, and 1 assist, however Fondi was relegated in Serie D after a 4–3 defeat on aggregate against Paganese in the Serie C play-out.

Loan to Pro Piacenza and Renate 
On 21 July 2018, Quaini was loaned to Serie C club Pro Piacenza on a season-long loan deal. On 23 September he made his Serie C debut for Pro Piacenza in a 3–1 away win over Alessandria, he was replaced by Giulio Sanseverino in the 75th minute. On 21 October he played his first entire match for Pro Piacenza, a 1–0 home defeat against Cuneo. He made 2 other appearances for the club, against Albissola and Cuneo. His loan was terminated during the 2018–19 season winter break and Quaini returned to Genoa leaving Pro Piacenza with only 4 appearances, 2 as a starter and 2 as a substitute.

On 26 January 2019, Quani was signed by another Serie C side, Renate, on a 6-month loan deal. On the same day he made his league debut for Renate as a substitute replacing Reno Piscopo in the 77th minute of a 1–1 away draw against Fermana. On 12 February, Quaini played his first match as a starter for the club, a 1–0 away win over Virtus Verona, he was replaced by Giusto Priola in the 89th minute. Three weeks later, on 3 March, he played his first entire match, a 1–0 home defeat against Ravenna. Quaini ended his 6-month loan to Renate with 15 appearances, including 10 as a starter.

Pisa 
On 24 July 2019, Quaini joined to newly promoted Serie B club Pisa for a free-transfer.

Loan to AlbinoLeffe 
One day later, Quaini was loaned to Serie C club AlbinoLeffe on a season-long loan deal. On 25 August he made his debut for the club as a substitute replacing Mario Ravasio in the 73rd minute of a 2–1 away win over Pistoiese. On 15 September, Quaini played his first match as a starter for AlbinoLeffe, a 0–0 home draw against Pianese, he was replaced by Simone Canestrelli after 50 minutes. Ten days later, on 25 September, he played his first entire match, a 1–1 home draw against Juventus U23. Quaini ended his season-long loan to AlbinoLeffe with 22 appearances, however he played only 3 entire matches during the season.

Loan to Monopoli 
On 31 January 2022, Quaini joined Monopoli on loan.

Fiorenzuola
On 27 August 2022, Quaini signed a one-season contract with Fiorenzuola.

Career statistics

Club

References

External links
 

1998 births
Sportspeople from Cremona
Living people
Italian footballers
Genoa C.F.C. players
S.S. Racing Club Fondi players
A.C. Renate players
U.C. AlbinoLeffe players
S.S. Monopoli 1966 players
U.S. Fiorenzuola 1922 S.S. players
Serie C players
Serie B players
Association football midfielders
Footballers from Lombardy